Lygophis paucidens, Hoge's ground snake, is a species of snake in the family Colubridae.  The species is native to Brazil and Paraguay.

References

Lygophis
Snakes of South America
Reptiles of Brazil
Reptiles of Paraguay
Reptiles described in 1953